The Angel of Bethesda is a book written by Cotton Mather, a Puritan minister from Massachusetts, in 1724.  The book would not be published until the 20th century.  It explains many illnesses in a spiritual context, attributing illnesses to demonic and divine sources.  It also endorsed the use of repentance and traditional folk medicine as treatment for mental illness.  The text blamed afflicted individuals for their own sickness.

References
Grob, Gerald N. (1994) The Mad Among Us. Harvard University Press.

Jones, Gordon, ed. (1972)  "Cotton Mather's 'The Angel of Bethesda: An Essay Upon the Common Maladies of Mankind.'"  Barre, Vt.  American Antiquarian Society.

See also
Faith Healing

Health and wellness books
1724 books